The Richardson Range is a small subrange of the Kitimat Ranges, located on the southwestern flank of Princess Royal Island east of Kent Inlet, British Columbia, Canada.

References

Richardson Range in the Canadian Mountain Encyclopedia

Kitimat Ranges